The Affair of Agbeluvoe (Agbéluvhoé, Beleaguer or  the Battle of Tsewie, was fought during the First World War between invading British Empire soldiers of the West African Rifles and German  (paramiltary police) in German Togoland (now Togo) on 15 August 1914. The only routes inland were by the railway and road, which had been built through dense and almost impassable jungle.

Two trainloads of German troops steamed south to engage the British and delay the Anglo-French invasion but were ambushed at Agbulovhoe, suffered many casualties and fled, leaving  of the railway to the north intact. After a halt of three days to accumulate supplies, the British advance resumed with support from French . The German colonial forces were capable of only one more defensive action at the Affair of Khra on 22 August.

Background

Strategic developments
An Offensive Sub-Committee of the British Committee of Imperial Defence was appointed on 5 August and established a principle that command of the seas was to be ensured. Territorial objectives were considered if they could be attained with local forces and if the objective assisted the priority of maintaining British sea communications, as British army garrisons abroad were returned to Europe in an "Imperial Concentration". Attacks on German coaling stations and wireless stations were considered to be important, to clear the seas of German commerce raiders. Objectives at Tsingtau, Luderitz Bay, Windhoek, Duala and Dar-es-Salaam were considered and a German wireless station in Togoland, next to the British colony of Gold Coast (now Ghana) on the Gulf of Guinea, was considered vulnerable to attack by local forces.

The high-power wireless transmitter had been built at Kamina and controlled German communication in the Atlantic Ocean, by linking a German transmitter at Nauen near Berlin with German colonies in west Africa and south America. At the outbreak of war, the German acting-Governor of Togoland, who had  police,  police and  guards but no regular army forces, had proposed neutrality to the British and French colonial authorities under the Congo Act 1885 and then withdrawn from Lomé and the coastal region, when the British demanded unconditional surrender. The acting-Governor, Major Hans-Georg von Doering had sent an un-coded wireless message to Berlin disclosing his plan to retreat to Kamina, which had been intercepted by the British and led to offensive operations against Kamina being authorised by the Colonial Office on 9 August. Anglo-French expeditions from northern Dahomey, Nigeria and the Gold Coast began on 12 August.

Tactical developments
On 6 August 1914, the British and French governments summoned the German authorities in Togoland to surrender; Anglo-French forces invaded the colony and occupied Lomé unopposed on 7 August and by 12 August, the southern portion of the colony was under Anglo-French control. In northern Togoland British and French troops, police and irregulars occupied Yendi and Mango on 14 August. As British and French forces advanced towards Kamina, the German commanders, acting-Governor Major Hans-Georg von Doering and the military commander, Captain Georg Pfähler attempted to delay the Allied advances by blowing bridges. The main British and French thrusts came from the south, where well built roads and railways from the coast made movement easy for both sides. To harass the West African Rifles of the West African Frontier Force (WAFF), German commanders filled two trains with  soldiers and sent them south to raid the Allies on 15 August 1914.

Engagement

By 14 August the British had reached Tsevié unopposed and patrols reported the country south of Agbeluvoe clear of German forces. The main British force assembled at Togblekove and "I" Company (Captain H. B. Potter) was sent forward by road to Agbeluvoe, followed by the main body on 15 August. When the main force reached Dawie, civilians reported that a train full of Germans had shot up the station at Tsevié earlier that morning. At Tsevié the British found that the train had steamed north and hurried on to support "I" Company. "I" Company had heard the train run south at  while halted on the road near Ekuni. A section was sent to cut off the train and the rest of "I" Company pressed on to Agbeluvoe.

A second train, carrying Captain Georg Pfähler, commander of the German forces in Togoland, stopped in front of the obstacle and managed to reverse before the ambushers reached it. The rest of "I" Company had heard the train pass, set another ambush and riddled the engine with bullets as it travelled past at full steam. The British parties rendezvoused and advanced to Agbeluvoe, where another road and rail block was established. Both trains were south of Agbeluvoe and the convoy of carriers with "I" Company's supplies was harassed by German attacks for two hours before they arrived at the British position. The position at Agbeluvoe had been attacked several times from the south; more attacks overnight were repulsed. As the main British force drew close, the Germans retired towards their train and eventually surrendered. The main force under Colonel F. C. Bryant had been engaged by a German party on the afternoon of 15 August at the Lila River, where the Germans blew the bridge and then retired to a ridge where they fought a delaying action holding up the British until  Three German dead were left behind; the British lost one man killed and three wounded. When the advance resumed the British reached Ekuni and found twenty railway carriages, which had been derailed by the obstruction near the bridge.

Many of the German soldiers reportedly took off their uniforms, threw down their guns and ran into the bush at the sight of the British ambush. The remaining Germans retreated northwards to Agbeluvoe where further fighting ensued, in which Pfähler was killed. A German prisoner wrote an account in September, which described the German force at Agbeluvoe as two companies of local soldiers, commanded by Pfähler. An attempt to break through the "I" Company road and rail block collapsed when the Togolese troops refused orders and then began shooting in all directions. Six Germans were killed including Pfähler, after which the troops fled; the remnants failed to contact Kamina and news of the disaster was eventually delivered by a German train driver who had been fired on at Agbeluvoe.

Next morning Baron Cordelli von Fahnenfeldt, who had designed the wireless station at Kamina and the German explosives expert were captured; the column set off for Agbeluvoe, no news having arrived from "I" Company. Slight opposition was met half way to the station and much abandoned equipment was found. The British lost six killed and  some of whom had injuries which raised suspicions that the Germans had used soft-nosed bullets, which was later discovered to have been partly true, as some hurriedly incorporated reservists had used their civilian hunting ammunition.

Aftermath

Analysis
The Germans lost a quarter of their troops in the attempt to use the railway to harass British forces to the south. It was considered a great failure and defeat for the Germans in Togoland. Although it may briefly have delayed the British northward advance, which was not resumed until 19 August, the Affair of Agbeluvoe had no lasting effect on the advance of the Allies. The wireless station at Kamina was demolished by the Germans, which cut off German ships in the South Atlantic from communication with Europe and influenced the Battle of the Falkland Islands (8 December 1914). On 26 August, eleven days after the battle, Doering surrendered. The German force of  comprising one German and seven Togolese companies, had been expected to be most difficult to defeat, given the terrain and the extensive entrenchments at Kamina. A German prisoner later wrote that few of the Germans had military training, the defences of Kamina had been too large for the garrison to defend and were ringed by hills. The Germans were not able to obtain information about the British in the neighbouring Gold Coast (Ghana) and instructions by wireless from Berlin only insisted that the transmitting station be protected. In the first three weeks of August, the transmitter had passed  from Nauen to German colonies and German shipping. Defence of the transmitter had wider operational effects but Doering made no attempt at protracted resistance.

Casualties
The British suffered  and the German forces  at the Affair of Agbeluvoe.

Subsequent operations
On 22 August the Affair of Khra was fought by the Anglo-French invaders and the Germans on the Khra River and in Khra (Chra) village. The German forces had dug in and repulsed the Anglo-French attack. A new attack on 23 August found that the Germans had retired further inland to Kamina. By the end of the campaign, six of seven provinces had been abandoned by the Germans, bridges had not been blown and only the Khra river line among the three possible water obstacles had been defended. The speed of the invasion by several British and French columns, whose size was over-estimated and lack of local support for the colonial regime, had been insuperable obstacles for the German colonialists. Togoland was occupied by the British and French for the duration of the war.

Notes

Footnotes

Bibliography

Books
 
 
 
 
 
 
 
 

Websites

Further reading

External links

 Togoland 1914 Harry's Africa Web 2012
 Funkentelegrafie Und Deutsche Kolonien: Technik Als Mittel Imperialistischer Politik. Familie Friedenwald
 Schutzpolizei uniforms

Battles of World War I involving Germany
Battles of World War I involving the United Kingdom
Military history of Togo
West Africa
1914 in Africa
Battles of the African Theatre (World War I)
20th century in Togo
August 1914 events